Uroš Nikolić (born 25 April 1987) is a Serbian professional basketball player for Fribourg Olympic of the Swiss Basketball League.

Professional career
Uroš had his first senior basketball experience with Hemofarm in 2005, after which he spent three years playing for a Belgrade-based club Mega Vizura. After a season spent with the Slovenian team Krka, he returned to Belgrade and signed a contract with Crvena zvezda in 2010.

In September 2012, he signed a contract with the Macedonian team MZT Skopje. In March 2013, he returned to Serbia and signed with Radnički Kragujevac for the rest of the 2012–13 season. In July 2013 he signed with Igokea. He left them in April 2014, and signed with Turów Zgorzelec of the Polish Basketball League. On 5 January 2015 he left Turów Zgorzele and signed with King Wilki Morskie Szczecin remaining on the Polish League.

On 25 October 2017 he signed with BBC Monthey for the rest of the 2017–18 Swiss Basketball League season.

Career statistics

Euroleague

|-
| style="text-align:left;"| 2014–15
| style="text-align:left;"| Turów
| 10 || 1 || 8.1 || .542 || .000 || .647 || 2.4 || 0.3 || 0.0 || 0.1 || 3.7 || 2.8
|- class="sortbottom"
| style="text-align:left;"| Career
| style="text-align:left;"|
| 10 || 1 || 8.1 || .542 || .000 || .647 || 2.4 || 0.3 || 0.0 || 0.1 || 3.7 || 2.8

References

External links

 Uroš Nikolić at aba-liga.com
 Uroš Nikolić at eurobasket.com
 Uroš Nikolić at euroleague.net

1987 births
Living people
ABA League players
Basketball League of Serbia players
BBC Monthey players
Belfius Mons-Hainaut players
Centers (basketball)
KK Crvena zvezda players
KK Hemofarm players
KK Igokea players
KK Krka players
KK Mega Basket players
KK MZT Skopje players
KK Radnički Kragujevac (2009–2014) players
Power forwards (basketball)
Serbian expatriate basketball people in Belgium
Serbian expatriate basketball people in Bosnia and Herzegovina
Serbian expatriate basketball people in Poland
Serbian expatriate basketball people in North Macedonia
Serbian expatriate basketball people in Slovenia
Serbian expatriate basketball people in Switzerland
Serbian men's basketball players
Sportspeople from Kragujevac
Turów Zgorzelec players
Vevey Riviera Basket players